Matthew Evans (born 2 January 1988) is a Canadian former rugby union player who most recently played for the Cornish Pirates in the RFU Championship. He is a utility back and has played in various back-line positions including fly-half, centre, wing, and fullback.

Evans competed at the 2008 IRB Junior World Championship representing Canada. He played five games and scored two tries, one versus Scotland and one versus Australia. Evans made his international debut for the Canada senior men's team in 2008 against Ireland at Thomond Park in Limerick.

He joined the Welsh regional team the Newport Gwent Dragons in the Celtic League in June 2010 but was released at the end of the 2010-11 Magners League.

On 8 July 2011 Evans was selected as part of the 30-man Canadian squad for the 2011 Rugby World Cup.

It was reported on 21 October 2011 that Evans would join RFU Championship side the Cornish Pirates as cover for the injured Wes Davies.

On March 9, 2020, Evans hung up his boots, retiring from professional rugby whilst taking on the role of Team Manager for the Cornish Pirates.

References

External links
Canada profile
Newport Gwent Dragons profile

1988 births
Living people
Canada international rugby sevens players
Canada international rugby union players
Canadian rugby union players
Cornish Pirates players
Dragons RFC players
Medalists at the 2011 Pan American Games
Pan American Games gold medalists for Canada
Pan American Games medalists in rugby sevens
People from Duncan, British Columbia
Rugby sevens players at the 2011 Pan American Games
Rugby union players from Salisbury